Serbia selected their Junior Eurovision entry for 2006 through a national final consisting of 10 songs. The winning song was selected exclusively by televoting, which was band  with "Učimo strane jezike".

Before Junior Eurovision

National final 
Ten songs competed in the final, held on 1 October 2006 in the Millennium Hall in Vršac, hosted by Bojana Stefanović, Sofija Juričan and Miki Damjanović. The winner was decided exclusively by SMS voting.

At Junior Eurovision

Voting

Notes

References

External links 
 Official RTS Website
 ESCKaz Page on Serbia's Entry

2006
Serbia
Junior Eurovision Song Contest